, there were around 72,000 battery electric vehicles registered in Belgium, equivalent to 1.2% of all vehicles in the country. , 5.8% of new cars sold in Belgium were electric.

Government policy
In 2021, the Belgian government announced a policy that, starting in 2026, makes all purchases of electric vehicles for company use tax-deductible.

Public opinion
In a 2022 poll conducted by Deloitte, 48% of respondents said that they would buy an electric car for their next vehicle purchase.

By region

Brussels
, there were 250 public charging stations in Brussels.

Flanders
, there were around 15,000 public charging station ports in the Flemish Region.

Wallonia
, there were between 1,500 and 2,000 public charging station ports in Wallonia.

References

Belgium
Road transport in Belgium